Karena Richardson (born 12 October 1959) is a British former figure skater who competed in ladies' singles. She is the 1976 Skate Canada International silver medalist and a four-time British national champion. She competed twice at the Winter Olympics, finishing 15th in 1976 and 12th in 1980. She was coached by Carlo Fassi in Denver, Colorado.

Richardson married Czech figure skater Zdeněk Pazdírek.

Competitive highlights

References

British female single skaters
English female single skaters
1959 births
Olympic figure skaters of Great Britain
Figure skaters at the 1976 Winter Olympics
Figure skaters at the 1980 Winter Olympics
Living people
Sportspeople from Kensington